Jarma is an administrative unit known as union council of Kohat District in the Khyber Pakhtunkhwa province of Pakistan.

District Kohat has 2 Tehsils i.e. Kohat and Lachi. Each Tehsil comprises certain numbers of Union council.  There are 27 union councils in district Kohat.

Kohat District
Populated places in Kohat District
Union councils of Khyber Pakhtunkhwa
Union Councils of Kohat District